The Gilbrae Inn is a historic residential building in Waltham, Massachusetts.  It was built as a two-story wood-frame structure by the Boston Manufacturing Company sometime between 1827 and 1854 as a boarding house for its workers.  In c. 1870 the mansard roof and third floor were added.  It is the only known surviving boarding house built by the company.  Its name derives from a cloth pattern manufactured by the company.

The building was listed on the National Register of Historic Places in 1989.

See also
National Register of Historic Places listings in Waltham, Massachusetts

References

Buildings and structures in Waltham, Massachusetts
Hotel buildings on the National Register of Historic Places in Massachusetts
Greek Revival architecture in Massachusetts
Second Empire architecture in Massachusetts
National Register of Historic Places in Waltham, Massachusetts